Raynham Center is a census-designated place (CDP) in the town of Raynham in Bristol County, Massachusetts, United States. The population was 4,100 at the 2010 census.

Geography
Raynham Center is located at  (41.931854, -71.043151).

According to the United States Census Bureau, the CDP has a total area of 11.3 km (4.4 mi). 11.0 km (4.3 mi) of it is land and 0.3 km (0.1 mi) of it (2.51%) is water.

Demographics

As of the census of 2000, there were 3,633 people, 1,235 households, and 1,037 families residing in the CDP. The population density was 329.3/km (852.5/mi). There were 1,252 housing units at an average density of 113.5/km (293.8/mi). The racial makeup of the CDP was 96.20% White, 1.05% African American, 0.03% Native American, 1.13% Asian, 0.08% Pacific Islander, 0.61% from other races, and 0.91% from two or more races. Hispanic or Latino of any race were 0.74% of the population.

There were 1,235 households, out of which 38.9% had children under the age of 18 living with them, 70.7% were married couples living together, 10.2% had a female householder with no husband present, and 16.0% were non-families. 13.0% of all households were made up of individuals, and 6.1% had someone living alone who was 65 years of age or older. The average household size was 2.94 and the average family size was 3.21.

In the CDP, the population was spread out, with 25.9% under the age of 18, 8.3% from 18 to 24, 28.7% from 25 to 44, 27.4% from 45 to 64, and 9.8% who were 65 years of age or older. The median age was 38 years. For every 100 females, there were 93.5 males. For every 100 females age 18 and over, there were 90.6 males.

The median income for a household in the CDP was $64,464, and the median income for a family was $66,531. Males had a median income of $43,718 versus $32,772 for females. The per capita income for the CDP was $24,131. About 3.7% of families and 2.3% of the population were below the poverty line, including 2.0% of those under age 18 and 4.9% of those age 65 or over.

References

Census-designated places in Bristol County, Massachusetts
Greater Taunton Area
Providence metropolitan area
Census-designated places in Massachusetts